Star Trek: The Exhibition is a traveling museum exhibit of Star Trek items and memorabilia. The exhibition includes items used in the films and television series such as props, costumes, set components and full-scale replicas of the Enterprise bridge.  Other comprehensive features of the exhibit including a complete time line, showing major events in the Star Trek Universe and how all of the various series and movies relate to one another chronologically, as well as a motion simulator ride.

Originally premiering as a single large exhibition Star Trek: The Tour under management of SEE Touring, financial complications arose when the show was packed up at the Queen Mary in Long Beach and the venue held onto the exhibits, until it was settled by Plainfield Asset Management acquiring the entire exhibition under undisclosed terms.

The exhibition was split into two separate smaller exhibitions which would display simultaneously in two locations.  They both feature a bridge recreation, one version of the exhibit includes the bridge from Star Trek: The Original Series and another replicates the Enterprise bridge from Star Trek: The Next Generation.

Locations
 Museum of Science. Boston, Massachusetts. November 1992 - May 1993.
 Mosney Holiday Centre, Mosney, Ireland. Summer 1994
 City Art Centre, Edinburgh, Scotland. February to May 1995
 The Science Museum, South Kensington, London, United Kingdom. Summer 1995
 The Powerhouse Museum, Sydney, New South Wales, Australia.  November 1997
 Queen Mary Dome, Long Beach, California. January – March 2008, as "Star Trek the Tour"
 San Diego Air and Space Museum, San Diego, California. June 2008
 Arizona Science Center, Phoenix, Arizona. November 2008 – May 2009
 Detroit Science Center, Detroit, Michigan. February – September 2009
 Franklin Institute, Philadelphia, Pennsyslvania. May – September 2009
 The Tech Museum of Innovation, San Jose, California. 2009
 Hollywood & Highland, Los Angeles, California. Fall – December 27, 2009
 Riverside Metropolitan Museum Showcase facility, Riverside, California. June 19, 2010 – February 28, 2011
 Aerospace Museum of California, North Highlands, California. May 28, 2010 – January 5, 2011
 Museo de las Ciencias Principe Felipe, Valencia, Spain. July 22, 2010 – February 22, 2011
 Louisville Science Center, Louisville, Kentucky. January 23 – May 22, 2011
 Filmpark Babelsberg, Potsdam, Germany. May – October 2011
 Kennedy Space Center, Merritt Island, Florida. June – October 2011
 Saint Louis Science Center, St. Louis, Missouri. October 2011 – May 2012
 International Drive, Orlando, Florida. May – August 2012
 Pacific National Exhibition, Vancouver, British Columbia, Canada. August 18 – September 3, 2012
 Pusat Sains Negara, Kuala Lumpur, Malaysia. December 13, 2012 – March 31, 2013
 Gandaria City Mall, Jakarta, Indonesia. June 1 – July 13, 2014
 Mall of America, Bloomington, Minnesota. May 16, 2014 – summer 2015
 Washington State Fair, Puyallup, Washington. September 11–27, 2015
 THE HUB Performance Center, Shanghai, China, September 1 – October 25, 2016
 Golden Mile, Blackpool, England, March 12-November 4, 2017

References

External links

Works about Star Trek
Museum events
Traveling exhibits
2008 establishments
Science fiction exhibitions